

Tarra White (born Martina Mrakviová, 19 November 1987) is a Czech pornographic actress.

Biography
White was born in Ostrava, Czechoslovakia.

At the age of five, White wanted to be a stripper when she grew up and would practice stripping in her bedroom. By age thirteen, she aspired to be a porn star and practiced posing with her mother's high heel shoes; her mother caught her practicing and was unhappy when she learned about her daughter's ambitions.

White entered the pornographic industry on her eighteenth birthday while still in college. She shot her first scene with Robert Rosenberg in public in front of the University of Prague. She was so stressed about being naked in front of many people in the middle of the street that she kept forgetting to look at the camera.

White is a contract performer for Private Media Group.

White retired as a performer in 2013.

Awards
 2006 Golden Star (Prague Erotica Show) for Best Starlet
 2007 Golden Star for Best Czech Republic Porn Actress
 2008 FICEB Ninfa Award for Best Supporting Actress (Wild Waves – Woodman Entertainment)
 2009 Hot d'Or Award for Best European Female Performer
 2009 Hot d'Or Award for Best European Actress (Billionaire – Private Media)
 2009 Erotixxx Award for Best European Actress
 2010 Erotixxx Award for Best International Actress
 2014 AVN Award for Best Sex Scene in a Foreign-Shot Production (The Ingenuous) (with Aleska Diamond, Anna Polina, Angel Piaff, Rita Peach and Mike Angelo)

References

External links

 
 
 
 
 

Czech pornographic film actresses
Actors from Ostrava
1987 births
Living people